BB4 may refer to:

BB4, a postcode district in the BB postcode area
Big Brother 4, a television programme in various versions
Bb4, the B♭ (musical note) a minor 7th above middle C